Marek Jurek (28 June 1960 in Gorzów Wielkopolski, Poland) is a right-wing politician and a Member of the European Parliament. Since 20 April 2007 he has been the leader of the aspirant party Right of the Republic. Politically, he is most known for being a Marshal of the Sejm in the years 2005–2007.

Biography
He is a graduate in history from Adam Mickiewicz University in Poznań. In the 1980s he was an activist in the anti-communist movement in Poland. After the fall of the communism in 1989, he was one of the founders of the now defunct political party Christian National Union. He was a deputy in the Contract Sejm and later in the Sejm of the Republic of Poland from 1991 to 1993.

From 1995 to 2001 he was a member of the National Broadcasting Council.

In 2001, he was elected a deputy of the Sejm again, this time as a member of the Law and Justice party. On 26 October 2005 he was elected a Sejm marshal (parliament speaker) nominated by Law and Justice with 265 votes (133 votes were given to Bronisław Komorowski from Civic Platform). On 13 April 2007 he resigned from the post, following the Sejm's failure to amend the Constitution to protect prenatal life. On the following day, he left Law and Justice to found his own party, now known as the Right of the Republic. His resignation was accepted on 27 April 2007.

In the parliamentary election in 2007 his party did not win any seats in the Parliament as it found itself below the election threshold. On 22 June 2008 Marek Jurek took part in a by-election to the Senate, held in Krosno-constituency following the death of Senator Andrzej Mazurkiewicz. With 10 751 votes, he gained the third place after the winner Stanisław Zając (Law and Justice) and Maciej Lewicki (Civic Platform). As there was only one seat available in the Senate, Marek Jurek remains outside the Parliament.

On 27 September 2009, Jurek was awarded the Commander's Cross of the Order of Polonia Restituta for outstanding contribution to the independence of Polish Republic, for activities on behalf of democratic change, for achievements in undertaken for the benefit of the country and social work.

He was one of the candidates in the 2010 Polish presidential election, but received only 1.06% of votes and failed to get into the second round.

Political positions
Marek Jurek declared full support for the teaching of the Catholic Church as he opposes abortion, euthanasia, same sex unions and in vitro. He supports the traditional family model.  He supports the Creighton Model FertilityCare System. Jurek is in favor of bringing the future back to the Polish and European traditions, cultivating a Christian civilization and Latin culture. He is a supporter of the "Tridentine Rite".

References

External links

 Sejm Marshal

1960 births
Living people
People from Gorzów Wielkopolski
Polish traditionalist Catholics
Solidarity Citizens' Committee politicians
Christian National Union politicians
Law and Justice politicians
Right Wing of the Republic politicians
Marshals of the Sejm of the Third Polish Republic
Members of the Contract Sejm
Members of the Polish Sejm 1991–1993
Members of the Polish Sejm 2001–2005
Members of the Polish Sejm 2005–2007
Candidates in the 2010 Polish presidential election
20th-century Polish historians
Polish male non-fiction writers
Commanders of the Order of Polonia Restituta
MEPs for Poland 2014–2019